Barry Peter Howard (born 9 February 1950 in Ashton-under-Lyne) is an English former professional footballer who played in the Football League, as a forward.

References

Sources
Profile at Neil Brown

1950 births
Living people
Footballers from Ashton-under-Lyne
English footballers
Association football forwards
Witton Albion F.C. players
Runcorn F.C. Halton players
Stockport County F.C. players
Altrincham F.C. players
Hyde United F.C. players
Ashton United F.C. players
Droylsden F.C. players
English Football League players